Marek Viedenský (born August 18, 1990) is a Slovak professional ice hockey forward. He is currently playing for the HKM Zvolen of the Slovak Extraliga.

Playing career
Viedenský was selected by the San Jose Sharks in the 7th round (189th overall) of the 2009 NHL Entry Draft.

In his professional rookie 2011–12 season Viedenský played 52 games with the Worcester Sharks of the AHL, and during the 2012–13 season Viedenský played with both the Worcester Sharks of the AHL and the San Francisco Bulls of the ECHL.

On August 2, 2013, the San Jose Sharks of the National Hockey League re-signed Viedenský to a one-year contract.

After three year within the San Jose Sharks organization, Viedensky left as a restricted free agent to sign a one-year contract with Finnish Liiga club, HPK  on June 16, 2014.

International play
As a member of Team Slovakia, Viedenský competed at the 2009 and 2010 World Junior Ice Hockey Championships.

Career statistics

Regular season and playoffs

International

Awards and honors

References

External links

1990 births
Living people
People from Handlová
Sportspeople from the Trenčín Region
San Jose Sharks draft picks
Prince George Cougars players
Saskatoon Blades players
Worcester Sharks players
San Francisco Bulls players
HPK players
HC Slovan Bratislava players
HC Oceláři Třinec players
HKM Zvolen players
Slovak ice hockey centres
Slovak expatriate ice hockey players in Canada
Slovak expatriate ice hockey players in Finland
Slovak expatriate ice hockey players in the United States
Slovak expatriate ice hockey players in the Czech Republic